The Women's 4 × 400 metres relay at the 2010 Commonwealth Games as part of the athletics programme was held at the Jawaharlal Nehru Stadium on Monday 11 October and Tuesday 12 October 2010.

Records

Round 1
First 3 in each heat (Q) and 2 best performers (q) advance to the Final.

Heat 1

Heat 2

Final

External links
2010 Commonwealth Games - Athletics

Women's 4 x 400
2010
2010 in women's athletics